Nationality words link to articles with information on the nation's poetry or literature (for instance, Irish or France).

Events
 The first blue plaque is erected in London by the Royal Society of Arts on the birthplace (1788) of English poet Lord Byron, subsequently demolished.

Works published in English

Canada
 Charles Heavysege, "Jezebel," New Dominion Monthly (Montreal)

United Kingdom 
 Matthew Arnold, New Poems, including "Dover Beach"
 Philip James Bailey, Universal Hymn (see also Festus 1839)
 Mathilde Blind, publishing under the pen name "Claude Lake", Poems
 Jean Ingelow, A Story of Doom, and Other Poems
 William Morris, The Life and Death of Jason
 Algernon Charles Swinburne, Song of Italy
 Augusta Webster, A Woman Sold, and Other Poems

United States
 George Arnold, Poems, Grave and Gay, published posthumously
 John Burroughs, Notes on Walt Whitman as Poet and Person, biography and criticism
 Ralph Waldo Emerson, May-Day and Other Pieces
 Bret Harte, The Lost Galleon
 Josiah Gilbert Holland, Kathrina: Her Life and Mine, in a Poem
 Emma Lazarus, Poems and Translations
 Henry Wadsworth Longfellow, Flower-de-Luce
 James Russell Lowell, The Biglow Papers, Second Series
 William Gilmore Simms, editor, War Poetry of the South
 Harriet Beecher Stowe, Religious Poems
 Rose Hartwick Thorpe, Curfew Must Not Ring Tonight
Henry Timrod, "Ode: Sung on the Occasion of Decorating the Graves of the Confederate Dead at Magnolia Cemetery, Charleston, S.C., 1867"
 Walt Whitman, Leaves of Grass, fourth edition (first edition 1855)
 John Greenleaf Whittier, The Tent on the Beach

Other in English

Australia:
 Adam Lindsay Gordon
 Ashtaroth, a Dramatic Lyric
 Sea Spray and Smoke Drift
 Henry Kendall – "Bell-Birds"

Works published in other languages

France
 François Coppée, Les Intimites and Poemes modernes, published from this year to 1869
 Alfred de Vigny, Journal d’un poète ("Journal of a Poet"), posthumously published

Other
 Lydia Koidula, Emajõe Ööbik ("The Nightingale of the Mother River"), Estonia
 Jan Neruda, Knihy veršů ("Books of Verses"), Czech
 Piet Paaltjens (François Haverschmidt), Snikken en grimlachjes: poëzie uit den studententijd ("Sobs and Bitter Grins: poetry of student days"), Netherlands

Births
Death years link to the corresponding "[year] in poetry" article:
 February 9 – Natsume Sōseki 夏目 漱石 (commonly referred to as "Sōseki"), pen name of Natsume Kinnosuke 夏目金之助 (died 1916), Japanese, Meiji Era novelist, haiku poet, composer of Chinese-style poetry, writer of fairy tales and a scholar of English literature; from 1984–2004, his portrait appears on the 1000 yen note (surname: Natsume)
 March 2 – Louis Lavater (died 1953), Australian
 March 15 – Lionel Pigot Johnson (died 1902), English
 April 10 – George William Russell "Æ" (died 1935), Irish
 June 5 - Paul-Jean Toulet (died 1920), French
 June 17 – Henry Lawson (died 1922), Australian
 August 2 – Ernest Dowson (died 1900), English poet, novelist and writer of short stories associated with the Decadent movement
 August 13 – Rudolf G. Binding (died 1938), Swiss-born German
 September 17 – Masaoka Shiki 正岡 子規, pen-name of  Masaoka Tsunenori 正岡 常規, who changes his name to Noboru 升 (died 1902), Japanese author, poet, literary critic, journalist and, early in his life, a baseball player (surname: Masaoka)
 November 8 – Sadakichi Hartmann (died 1944), American
 November 26 – Roderic Quinn (died 1949), Australian

Deaths

Birth years link to the corresponding "[year] in poetry" article:
 January 5? – Alexander Smith (born 1829), Scottish Spasmodic poet 
 January 20 – Nathaniel Parker Willis (born 1806), American author, poet and editor
 February 2 – Forceythe Willson (born 1837), American poet
 February 23 – Pietro Zorutti (Pieri Çorut, born 1792), Friulian poet
 August 31 – Charles Baudelaire  (born 1821), French poet, critic and translator
 October 7 – Henry Timrod (born 1829), American poet
 November 19 – Fitz-Greene Halleck (born 1790), American poet
 John Hollin Ridge (born 1827), American poet

See also

 19th century in poetry
 19th century in literature
 List of years in poetry
 List of years in literature
 Victorian literature
 French literature of the 19th century
 Poetry

Notes

Poetry
19th-century poetry